SS Francis L. Lee was a Liberty ship built in the United States during World War II. She was named after Founding Father Francis L. Lee, a member of the House of Burgesses, in the Colony of Virginia. As an active protester regarding issues such as the Stamp Act, Lee helped move the colony in the direction of independence from Britain. Lee was a delegate to the Virginia Conventions and the Continental Congress. He was a signer of the Articles of Confederation and the United States Declaration of Independence as a representative of Virginia.

Construction
Francis L. Lee was laid down on 13 October 1941, under a Maritime Commission (MARCOM) contract, MCE hull 26, by the Bethlehem-Fairfield Shipyard, Baltimore, Maryland; sponsored by Mrs. L.R. Sanford and Mrs. William C. Sealy, the wife and daughter of L.R. Sanford, the chief of the inspection section at the Bethlehem-Fairfield Shipyard, and was launched on 14 March 1942.

History
She was allocated to Seas Shipping Co., Inc., on 27 April 1942. On 4 February 1947, she was laid up in the National Defense Reserve Fleet, Wilmington, North Carolina. She was sold for scrapping on 4 February 1965, to Norbo Trading Corp.

References

Bibliography

 
 
 
 

 

Liberty ships
1942 ships
Ships built in Baltimore
Wilmington Reserve Fleet
Ships named for Founding Fathers of the United States